Ismael Silva may refer to:

 Ismael Silva (musician) (1905-1978), Brazilian samba musician
 Ismael Silva (footballer) (born 1994), Brazilian footballer